Sir Patrick Joseph Keenan, KCMG, CB, PC (1826 – 1 November 1894) was an Irish educationalist and education administrator.

His son was the Australian lawyer and politician Sir Norbert Keenan.

References 

 https://www.oxforddnb.com/view/10.1093/ref:odnb/9780198614128.001.0001/odnb-9780198614128-e-37624
 https://www.dib.ie/biography/keenan-sir-patrick-joseph-a4429

1894 deaths
1836 births
Knights Commander of the Order of St Michael and St George
Companions of the Order of the Bath
Members of the Privy Council of Ireland
Irish justices of the peace
Irish civil servants